Thorkell the Tall, also known as Thorkell the High in the Anglo-Saxon Chronicle (Old Norse: Þorke(ti)ll inn hávi; ; Swedish: Torkel Höge), was a prominent member of the Jomsviking order and a notable lord. He was a son of the Scanian chieftain Strut-Harald, and a brother of Jarl Sigvaldi, Hemingr and Tófa. Thorkell was the chief commander of the Jomsvikings and the legendary stronghold Jomsborg, on the Island of Wollin. He is also credited as having received the young Cnut the Great into his care and taken Cnut on raids. The Encomium Emmae, a document aimed at the movers and shakers of the Anglo-Scandinavian court in the early 1040s, describes Thorkell as a great war leader and warrior.

Thorkell notably partook in a campaign that saw him lead a great Viking army to Kent in 1009, where they proceeded to overrun most of Southern England. This soon culminated in the siege of Canterbury in 1011 and the kidnapping of archbishop Ælfheah, who had previously converted Olaf Tryggvason, and Ælfheah's subsequent murder at Greenwich on 19 April 1012.

Biography
Thorkell is a historical figure, but his career, especially its early part, is steeped in associations with the legendary Jomsvikings. Thorkell took part in the Battle of Hjörungavágr in 986 and in the Battle of Swold in 1000.

In August 1009, a large Danish army led by Thorkell the Tall landed on the shores of Sandwich. They first marched towards the city of Canterbury but were promptly paid 3000 pounds of silver by the people of Kent to sway the army from attacking. They instead turned towards London and attempted to take the city several times, but were met with heavy resistance and ultimately abandoned their attack.

On 8 September 1011 the Viking army returned to Canterbury and besieged the city for three weeks, eventually taking it through the treachery of a man named Ælfmaer, whose life had been previously saved by the archbishop of Canterbury, Ælfheah. Thorkell and his men occupied Canterbury and took several hostages of importance, including Ælfheah himself, who was held prisoner for seven months. During the captivity, Ælfheah seems to have taken the opportunity to convert as many of the Vikings as possible to Christianity, prompting tension. The Vikings demanded an extra 3000 pounds of silver for the release of the archbishop, but Ælfheah bravely refused to be ransomed or have his people pay the invaders. As a consequence, Ælfheah was murdered by Thorkell's men during a drunken feast at Greenwich on 19 April 1012: the Vikings pelted him with the bones of cattle before one Viking finished him off with a blow to the back of the head with the butt of an axe. Thorkell was said to have tried his best to prevent the death of the archbishop, offering the attackers everything he possessed to stop the killing, save for his ship. And someone, possibly Thorkell, is said to have carried the corpse to London the day after the murder. Thorkell's army eventually ceased their attacks across Southern England, but only after a large series of danegeld payments were made, eventually culminating to 48,000 pounds of silver.

Disillusioned by the archbishop's murder, and sensing that he was losing control over his men, Thorkell and several other loyalists defected, taking 45 Viking ships with them. He and his men subsequently entered into the service of the English King Æthelred the Unready as mercenaries, for whom they fought in 1013 against the invasion of Danish King Sweyn Forkbeard and his son Cnut.

It is not entirely clear how Thorkell became part of Cnut's army prior to the Battle of Assandun in 1016, especially considering the former's role in opposing Cnut and his father's invasion of England in 1013 and escorting Æthelred the Unready into exile, but it is assumed that Cnut considered him a valuable asset and powerful ally. Given the Jomsvikings' role in political events in Scandinavia, the possibility exists that Thorkell played a masterminding role in assisting with Sweyn Forkbeard's 1013 invasion and Cnut's re-invasion a few years later. After the death of Edmund Ironside on 30 November 1016, Cnut became king of England and he divided the country into four earldoms – making Thorkell the Jarl of East Anglia.

In 1021, for unknown reasons, Thorkell is very briefly described as falling out with Cnut, with the former being banished by the king and returning to Denmark. However, Cnut later reconciled with Thorkell in 1023, seemingly aware of the strong connections and influence he had in his home country and that he was too powerful a man to be made an enemy of. As a result, he was granted the earldom of Denmark and given custody of Cnut's son Harthacnut, to whom Thorkell would serve as foster-father.  Thorkell's rule was a short one, with Cnut's brother-in-law Ulf the Earl to become Jarl of Denmark a year later. The perceived power vacuum of Thorkell's unexplained absence after 1023 and the commitment of Cnut in England, prompted King Olaf II of Norway and King Anund Jacob of Sweden to launch attacks on the Danish in the Baltic Sea. The Swedish and Norwegian navies led by kings Anund Jacob and Olaf II lay in wait up the river for the navy of King Cnut, which was commanded by Danish earl Ulf Jarl. Now known as the Battle of Helgeå, the decisive victory left Cnut the dominant leader in Scandinavia.

There is no mention of Thorkell after 1023, and he seems to have disappeared from the historical record,. Maybe he was cast out of the kingdom to return to Jomsborg or Scania. Alternatively, he may have died soon after he was made Jarl of Denmark, presumably in 1024. One theory is that he was chased down by an angry mob, another that he was simply too old for any more conflict; the Jomsvikings were known to have men serving in the fighting ranks of age 18 to 50. With no military commands, the final years of his life could have been spent at court or on his estates. He may have died in battle in 1039, a year before his foster son Harthacnut joined Emma of Normandy in Bruges prior to travelling to England and claiming the throne.

Thorkell, celebrated in his life time by the poets, appears in the Jomsvikinga Saga and on runestones for his exploits. Thorkell's proven shrewd nature and wisdom were well documented. The sometimes contradictory contemporary literature of the Encomium Emmae has Thorkell as being in service of, rather than the threat to, Cnut and Harthacnut's authority. It is known one of Thorkell's sons was a prominent member of Harthacnut's retinue; after the collapse and subsequent death of Harthacnut at the wedding feast of Tovi the Proud in 1042, Thorkell's wife and two sons were expelled from England. This was possibly linked to the intrigue that surrounded Magnus the Good's letter of intention to invade the realm of Edward the Confessor, with the ambition to reunite the kingdoms of what is now described as the North Sea Empire.

Family
Thorkell may have married a daughter of Æthelred the Unready called Wulfhild or Edith, who was the widow of Ulfcytel Snillingr. Thorkell had a son who accompanied Cnut back to England in 1023.

References

Further reading

External links
Canute and His empire (University College London by G. N. Garmonsway)

Note

Anglo-Norse people
Jomsvikings
Viking warriors
Earls and ealdormen of East Anglia
10th-century births
11th-century deaths
11th-century Vikings